Pseudathyma uluguru is a butterfly in the family Nymphalidae. It is found in Tanzania. The habitat consists of montane forests.

Subspecies
Pseudathyma uluguru uluguru (Tanzania: Uluguru)
Pseudathyma uluguru abriana Collins, 2002 (Tanzania)

References

Endemic fauna of Tanzania
Butterflies described in 1985
Pseudathyma